Kętrzyn (until 1946 Rastembork) is a town in northeastern Poland with 27,478 inhabitants (2019). It is the capital of Kętrzyn County in the Warmian-Masurian Voivodeship.

The town is known for the surrounding Masurian Lakeland and numerous monuments of historical value such as the Wolf's Lair in nearby Gierłoż, where an assassination attempt against Hitler was made in 1944.

History 

The original inhabitants of the region were the Balt tribe of the Aesti, mentioned by Tacitus in his Germania (AD 98). The town, known in German as Rastenburg and in Polish as Rastembork, was established in 1329 in the State of the Teutonic Knights and was granted town rights in 1357 by Henning Schindekop.

After the Battle of Grunwald, in 1410, the mayor surrendered the town to Poland, however, it fell back to the Teutonic Knights in 1411. In 1440, the town joined the anti-Teutonic Prussian Confederation. Upon the request of the Confederation, King Casimir IV Jagiellon incorporated the region and town to the Kingdom of Poland in 1454. The town then recognized the Polish King as the rightful ruler and the townspeople sent their representative to Königsberg to pay homage to the King.

After the Thirteen Years’ War (1454–1466) the town was part of Poland as a fief held by the Teutonic Order's state and, from 1525 to 1701, it was part of the Duchy of Prussia, a Polish fief until 1657. In the second half of the 17th century, Poles constituted around a half of the town's population, the other half being Germans. In 1667, a Polish church school was established.

In 1701 the town became part of the Kingdom of Prussia and subsequently, in 1871, part of Germany. During the Seven Years' War, from 1758 to 1762, the town was occupied by the Russians, in June 1807, throughout the Napoleonic wars, the division of General Jan Henryk Dąbrowski was stationed in the town. Following the unsuccessful Polish November Uprising, in 1832–1833, Polish insurgents, including several officers, were interned in the town.

In the late 19th century a Polish Lutheran parish still existed in Rastenburg, despite the policy of Germanisation conducted by the Prussian authorities. In the second half of the 19th century, a sugar factory, brewery and mill were built.

20th century

Rastenburg and the surrounding district was the scene of the First World War's First Battle of the Masurian Lakes and Second Battle of the Masurian Lakes. During the Second World War Adolf Hitler's wartime military headquarters, the Wolf's Lair, was in the forest east of Rastenburg. The bunker was the setting for the failed assassination attempt of the 20 July plot against Hitler. During the war, the Germans operated a forced labour camp for Jews in the town.

In 1945, the area suffered devastation from both the retreating Germans and advancing Soviets during the Vistula-Oder campaign. Some ruins of the Wolf's Lair remain. The town was a Wehrmacht garrison town until it was occupied by the Red Army on January 27, 1945. The largely abandoned town was heavily destroyed by the Soviets.

After the war, the town was transferred to Poland under border changes promulgated at the Potsdam Conference. Its surviving German residents who had not evacuated were subsequently expelled westward in accordance with the Potsdam Agreement and replaced with Poles, most of whom were themselves expelled from the pre-war Polish Vilnius Region that was annexed by the Soviet Union and given to the Lithuanian Soviet Socialist Republic. The town was given the historic Polish name Rastembork in 1945, and in 1946 it was renamed to Kętrzyn after the Polish historian, activist and patriot Wojciech Kętrzyński, who attended the local gymnasium in the years 1855–1859.

After the war, the town's life was being rebuilt. In 1945, the Municipal Theater was established. Thanks to voluntary contributions, books were purchased for newly organized public libraries. A museum was created in the renovated castle.

From 1975 to 1998, Kętrzyn was administratively located in the Olsztyn Voivodeship.

Climate
Although it officially qualifies as an oceanic, defined as Cfb for Köppen classification (−3 °C isotherm), its averages are much closer to a warm-summer humid continental climate, denoted as Dfb, being better defined like that. The climate of the city has a considerable thermal amplitude, but still with some not so pronounced influence of the sea.

Sports
It competes in the lower leagues.

People 

 Johann Dietrich von Hülsen (1693–1767), Prussian general
 Karl Bogislaus Reichert (1811–1883), German anatomist, embryologist and histologist.
 Wojciech Kętrzyński (1838–1918), Polish historian and activist
 Elisabet Boehm (1859–1943), German women's rights advocate
 Arno Holz (1863–1929), German poet and dramatist
 Wilhelm Wien (1864–1928), German physicist worked on blackbody radiation
 Emma Döll (1873–1930), German politician (SPD/USPD/KPD)
 Rüdiger von Heyking (1894–1956), German Luftwaffe general
 Hanns Scharff (1907–1992), German Luftwaffe interrogator internationally renowned for developing humane, effective interrogation techniques
 Waldemar Grzimek (1918–1984), German sculptor
 Siegfried Tiefensee (1922–2009), German composer
 Dietrich von Bausznern (1928–1980), German composer, cantor, organist and music teacher
 Marek Ziółkowski (born 1955), Polish diplomat
 Krzysztof Kononowicz (born 1963), former candidate for the office of mayor of Białystok and internet celebrity
 Piotr Lech (born 1968), Polish footballer
 Krzysztof Raczkowski (1970–2005), musician and drummer of the Polish death metal band Vader
 Piotr Trafarski (born 1983), Polish footballer

Gallery

International relations

Twin towns – Sister cities
Kętrzyn is twinned with:
  Volodymyr, Ukraine
  Wesel, Germany
  Zlaté Hory, Czech Republic
  Svetly, Russia

References

External links

 Municipal webpage
 Kętrzyn

Castles of the Teutonic Knights
Cities and towns in Warmian-Masurian Voivodeship
Kętrzyn County
Populated places established in the 1320s